Jeffrey Wood (born September 12, 1969 in Juneau, Wisconsin) was a member of the Wisconsin State Assembly representing the 67th district from 2002 to 2011. He was elected as a Republican and later ran as an Independent.

Biography
Wood attended University of Wisconsin–Eau Claire in Eau Claire, Wisconsin. He is married and has two children.

Arrest
In 2008 he was arrested on suspicion of drunk driving. Following an accident in which his car reportedly became airborne, and marijuana was found in the Representative's vehicle, his blood alcohol content was more than double the legal limit .

In September 2009, Wood was arrested again for suspicion of operating while intoxicated (OWI) which was his fourth arrest for driving while intoxicated.  Following his fourth arrest, State Representative Steve Nass proposed a resolution to expel Wood from the Assembly if he did not resign. Wood responded that he would seek treatment for his substance abuse problem.

In October 2009, Wood was arrested again in Tomah, Wisconsin for operating while intoxicated and charged with bail jumping. He was convicted on April 19, 2010 of operating while intoxicated and possession of drug paraphernalia, and sentenced to 45 days in jail with over $1,600 in fines.

On January 12, 2011, Wood pleaded no contest to a fifth-offense operation charge, a felony, and a misdemeanor bail jumping charge (which was later dropped). He has been sentenced to spend nine months in jail, with three years probation.

Wood has stated he will not run for reelection.

References

External links
 

Members of the Wisconsin State Assembly
Living people
1969 births
University of Wisconsin–Eau Claire alumni
Wisconsin politicians convicted of crimes
21st-century American politicians
People from Juneau, Wisconsin